Parkway South High School is a public comprehensive high school in Manchester, St. Louis County, Missouri, United States. It is part of the Parkway School District. Since starting a renovation in 2010, the school has built a new science wing, has implemented new technology in every classroom, has installed turf, and is currently working towards rebuilding its three gyms.

History
Parkway South High School opened in 1976, the bicentennial of the United States Declaration of Independence. For this reason, the school mascot is the Patriot and the colors are red, white, and blue.

Activities
For the 2013–2014 school year, the school offered 28 activities approved by the Missouri State High School Activities Association (MSHSAA): baseball, boys' and girls' basketball, sideline/competition cheerleading, boys' and girls' cross country, dance team, field hockey, 11-man football, boys' and girls' golf, girls' lacrosse, music activities, scholar bowl, boys' and girls' soccer, softball, speech and debate, boys' and girls' swimming and diving, boys' and girls' tennis, boys' and girls' track and field, boys' and girls' volleyball, water polo, and wrestling. In addition to its current activities, Parkway South students have won several state championships, including:
Cheerleading: 2001, 2018
Boys' golf: 2021
Girls' softball: 1989, 1991, 1995
Boys' swimming and diving: 1999, 2000, 2001
Girls' swimming and diving: 2022
Boys' soccer: 2007

Parkway South also has had one individual girls' cross country state champion, three individual boys' track and field state champions, two individual girls' track and field state champions, three relay girls' track and field state champions, and three individual wrestling state champions.

Activities include the "Spirit of '76" Marching Band, performing arts, clubs, and school publications.

Alumni
 Atiyyah Ellison, former NFL player.
 Ray Everett, author
 Sarah Haskins, 2008 Olympic Triathlete
 Scott Langley, professional golfer

 Greg Raymer, 2004 World Series of Poker Main Event champion

References

Educational institutions established in 1976
High schools in St. Louis County, Missouri
Public high schools in Missouri
1976 establishments in Missouri